Nephrogramma reniculalis, the kidney moth, is a moth in the family Crambidae. It was described by Zeller in 1872. It is found in North America, where it has been recorded from Arizona, Colorado, Georgia, Illinois, Indiana, Iowa, Kansas, Kentucky, Mississippi, Ohio, Oklahoma, Ontario and Texas.

References

Glaphyriinae
Moths described in 1872